Kanakalapeta is a revenue village in the Yanam District of Puducherry, India.

References 

Villages in Yanam district